Gace may refer to:

Places
Gacé, commune in the Orne in France
Gače, abandoned settlement near Kočevje in Slovenia

People
Gace Brulé (c. 1160 – after 1213), French trouvère
Anita Gaće (born 1983), Croatian handballer
Aurela Gaçe (born 1974), Albanian singer
Ismaël Gace (born 1986), French football defender
William Gace (fl. 1580), English translator

Other uses
 GACE, standardized test in the U.S. state of Georgia